James Harrison (1814–66) was an English architect who worked mainly in Chester, Cheshire.  He worked mainly on churches — building new churches, rebuilding old churches, and making amendments and alterations to existing churches.  Harrison also designed a number of houses in the Queen's Park area of Chester, and farm buildings on the Bolesworth estate.

Harrison and Thomas Mainwaring Penson were the first architects to introduce buildings of the Black-and-white Revival to Chester in the 1850s.  His rebuilding of God's Providence House in Watergate Street is described as "the first conservation case in the modern sense".

Key

Works

References

Bibliography

 
Lists of buildings and structures by architect